"Who Are You" is the title track on the Who's 1978 album, Who Are You, the last album released by the group before Keith Moon's death in September 1978. It was written by Pete Townshend and released as a double-A-sided single with the John Entwistle composition "Had Enough", also featured on the album. The song was one of the band's biggest hits in North America, peaking at number 7 in Canada and at number 14 in the United States, and has become one of the band's signature tunes at their live shows. The piano on the track is played by Rod Argent.

Background

The lyrics of "Who Are You" were inspired by an incident Townshend experienced. After going out drinking with Steve Jones and Paul Cook of the Sex Pistols, Townshend was found in a "Soho doorway" by a policeman, who recognized him and said he would let him go if he could safely walk away.

However, as explained by Townshend in his autobiography Who I Am, the last verse is about an early incident, that happened on the last North American leg of the 1971 tour: the day before the first concert in Charlotte, North Carolina, Townshend took the opportunity to visit the Meher Spiritual Center—a retreat owned by his guru Meher Baba—in nearby Myrtle Beach.

"Who Are You" was released as a double-A side with the John Entwistle song, "Had Enough," but "Who Are You" was the more popular song, reaching the Top 20 in both the United States and UK. The song has since been featured on multiple compilation albums.
The single mix contains an alternate acoustic guitar solo to the album mix.

Lyrics
The album version includes a third verse compared to the much shorter single. Additionally, a "lost verse" mix of the song was released on the 1996 reissue of Who Are You, with a completely different second verse: "I used to check my reflection / Jumping with my cheap guitar / I must have lost my direction, 'cause I ended up a superstar / One-nighters in the boardroom / Petrify the human brain / You can learn from my mistakes, but you're posing in the glass again."

The song is unusual in that it contains two instances of the word "fuck"—at 2:16 and 5:40 (at 2:14 and 4:27 in the single edit version)—yet has been played frequently in its entirety on rock radio stations (as compared to an edited form replacing it with "hell"). The expletives, while not clearly enunciated and slightly obscured by Moon's drum fills, are nevertheless quite audible. This led to some controversy when ABC's unedited broadcast of The Who's Live 8 performance retained them. The American single edit changes this to "Who the hell are you?" and can be heard at 1:55. Other versions replaced the phrase with just one of the main choruses, "Tell me, who are you" and "I really want to know."

Reception
Cash Box said that it "has a gentle, jumpy chorus riding atop driving guitar chording by Townshend" and that "Daltrey's lead vocals are gritty and inquiring."  Record World said that "The instrumentation is powerful in contrast to the flowing vocal hook."

Video
A promotional video was filmed on 9 May 1978 for The Kids Are Alright documentary; originally, the intent was to have The Who simply mime to the single version's backing track with Roger Daltrey adding live vocals, but the decision was made to also re-record the guitars, backing vocals, drums, and piano. Only John Entwistle's bass and the synthesizer backing remained intact from the original version.

Live performances
This song was first performed live at the Gaumont State Cinema in Kilburn on 15 December 1977, albeit without synthesizers and only a portion of the lyrics. This can be seen in the DVD At Kilburn 1977 + Live at the Coliseum. Despite that being the first performance, this song had its roots in jams in the band's 1976 concerts, most notably at Maple Leaf Gardens in Toronto on 21 October 1976, drummer Keith Moon's last North American appearance with The Who, where the band played a very early version of the song with Townshend on vocals.

The first live performance with synthesizers (using a backing tape of the same synthesizer track found on the studio version of the song) was at the Rainbow Theatre in London on 2 May 1979, which was also Kenney Jones's first live show with the band. Since that time it has remained a staple of their live shows. The Who opened their segment of The Concert for New York City on 20 October 2001 with the song and performed a medley featuring the song in Super Bowl XLIV. They also used the song to begin their set at 12-12-12: The Concert for Sandy Relief on 12 December 2012. In later performances, Roger Daltrey also plays acoustic rhythm guitar.

Charts

Certifications

Personnel

The Who
Roger Daltrey - lead vocals, percussion
Pete Townshend - electric guitar, acoustic guitar, backing vocals, synthesizer
John Entwistle - bass guitar, backing vocals, synthesizer
Keith Moon - drums, percussion

Additional personnel
Rod Argent - piano
Andy Fairweather Low - backing vocals

In popular culture
 "Who Are You" was used as background music in a scene from the Nicolas Roeg movie Bad Timing.
 "Who Are You" is the theme to the TV show CSI: Crime Scene Investigation and its sequel series CSI: Vegas. Furthermore, an episode even took its title from the song (Season 1 Episode 6). Also, in the series 150th episode, Roger Daltrey himself guest-starred (in the season 7 episode "Living Legend").
A modified version was used in the opening of the television series Two and a Half Men, in the episode "Fish in a Drawer".
 Video game Rock Band features the song as part of a 12-pack of downloadable tracks from The Who.
 The Blanks/Worthless Peons in TV show Scrubs perform part of the song in the episode "My Identity Crisis".
 An abbreviated version of the song was performed during the halftime show of Super Bowl XLIV.
 Louis C.K. sings along to the song in the "Country Drive" episode of Louie.
 "Who Are You" is heard during the 7th season of ESPN's Gruden's QB Camp.
 "Who Are You" is used as the theme song to most international versions of the mystery singing competition series The Masked Singer including the American version.

References

External links
 

1977 songs
1978 singles
CSI: Crime Scene Investigation
MCA Records singles
Obscenity controversies in music
Polydor Records singles
Song recordings produced by Glyn Johns
Songs written by Pete Townshend
Television drama theme songs
Television game show theme songs
The Masked Singer (American TV series)
The Who songs